Stachys affinis, commonly called crosne, Chinese artichoke, Japanese artichoke, knotroot, or artichoke betony, is a perennial herbaceous plant of the family Lamiaceae, originating from China. Its rhizome is a root vegetable that can be eaten raw, pickled, dried or cooked.

Description 

The green leaves are opposite arranged on the stem. The leaves are separated into a leaf blade and a petiole. By medullary primary growth they thicken primarily on the internodes and less on the nodes. This way at irregular intervals constricted tubers are formed, which are usually thinner on both ends. The tubers are coby covered with a thin, pale-beige-to-ivory skin. The flesh underneath is white and tender.

Compounds 
Vacuoles in the tuber of S. affinis are rich in stachyose. Stachyose is a tetrasaccharide, consist out of galactose, glucose and fructose. Stachyose is evaluated to be about 230 mg/kg in dry tubers.

Origin and history 
S. affinis originates from central and northern China. It had been cultivated in China by the 13th century.

Before S. affinis was introduced to Europe, a related crop named S. palustris was collected in nature to be consumed as a vegetable. Later on the Germanic peoples used S. recta, which is a further relative of S. affinis, as a medicinal plant. The plant was then cultivated from the 18th century onwards. In 1882 the crop was cultivated on a farm for the first time in Crosne. S. affinis is the only labiate which is cultivated as vegetable in Europe. At the beginning of the 20th century S. affinis became more and more popular until it was abandoned again in the 1970s due to problems with viruses and the plant's strong vagility (tendency to spread). Since 1990 there has been a rise in the cultivation of S. affinis again and it is available in some markets and in some grocery shops. Today the plant is listed in the "Handbook of Alien Species in Europe" as an invasive plant in Europe.

Taxonomy 
The plant is part of the family Lamiaceae. A later described species, named S. sieboldii, in dedication to the German-Dutch botanist and japanologist Philipp Franz von Siebold, is considered to be a synonym.

Cultivation 
S. affinis is planted as a bulb (vegetative) in spring (March–May). Weeding is necessary but it is important not to damage the root system. A sufficient water supply during summer is important.

Harvest is from November to March. It is important that the soil is not frozen when harvesting.

The storage of S. affinis tubers is difficult. Because of their thin skin, they can be stored only for a few days, about a week in a fridge. An alternative can be a fresh ongoing harvesting out of humid sand, thereby the tubers stay fresh for several months.

Usage

Culinary 
The tubers have a crunchy texture and a sweet, nutty flavour. They can be eaten raw, pickled, dried or cooked. A wide range of uses for this vegetable leads to various dishes in the cuisine of many countries. They can be prepared similarly to Jerusalem artichokes. The leaves can be dried and made into a tea.

In Chinese and Japanese cuisine, S. affinis is primarily pickled. Dyed red by leaves of Perilla (red ) after being pickled, it is called . In Korea it is called .

In French cuisine, its cooked tuber is often served alongside dishes named japonaise or Japanese-styled.

Medicinal 
In traditional Chinese medicine, the entirety of S. affinis is used as an agent to treat colds and pneumonia.

In addition, root extract of S. affinis has shown antimicrobial activity. Furthermore, Baek et al. observed antioxidant activity in 2004. Also in 2004 inhibitory effects on acetylcholine esterase, monoamine oxidase and xanthine oxidase activities were observed in rat brains after 20 days of feeding with methanolic extracts of S. affinis. Ethanol extract from this plant also seems to have antitumour activity.

References

External links 

 Stachys affinis in Plants for a Future database
 
 Crosnes

affinis
Root vegetables
Japanese vegetables
Taxa named by Alexander von Bunge
Plants described in 1833